Ukpor is the headquarters of Nnewi South Local Government Area in Anambra State, South-East Nigeria. Ukpor has a collection of villages, each coming from different quarters.

Ukpor is noted for its hilly topography, with one of the most notable of the hills that traditionally known as "ugwu ekwensu", which means "the devil's own hill", and presently known as Ugwuonyezuberem.  In modern times, however, continuous grading of the road that crosses this hill has been reducing its height of this historic high land.

Ukpor people were predominantly farmers in the past. Subsequently, the area's prominent residents became mainly traders and sundry types of business men and women.

The town's apex body, Ukpor Improvement Union (U.I.U) remains the super-structural political, social and cultural organization in the community.

The current President General of U.I.U is Chief Ignatius Nwawulu (Dara Obiekunie) from Umu-Ehim, Umunuko, Ukpor.

Nnewi South is now known as Mbaneri by its students in higher institutions. Mbaneri means the ten towns in Nnewi South, which are Akwaihedi, Amichi, Azigbo, Ebenator, Ekwulumili, Ezinifite, Osumenyi, Ukpor, Unubi and Utuh.

Culture

Asara

Asara is the greatest cultural festival celebrated by Ukpor community at a periodic intervals of ten, fifteen or even twenty years. Historically, the origin of the cultural festival is be traced Ọgụ Agbaja (War of Agbaja) which was an intercommunal war between the people of Ukpor in the present-day Nnewi South Local Government and the people of Nnewi in the present-day Nnewi North Local Government, and in which the Ukpor people emerged victorious, after killing Metuh, the then greatest and most dreaded warrior of Nnewi

The war was caused by unwarranted and undeserved maltreatment from the then King of Nnewi who would always compel the young men and women of the neighbouring communities to take particular days that they would go and work for him, and which they were to go with their foods and water, as there were no provisions for any refreshment made by the king, who never rewarded, entertained nor appreciated the labourers in any way.

Hence, the then newly emerged Ukpor king determined never to tolerate but to put a perpetual end to such an inhumane act; and consequently issued an order condemning and prohibiting that. This infuriated the king of Nnewi, that he pronounced a war against those neighbouring communities for their act which he term 'rebellious'; and they began the war with their nearest community which is the present-day Ukpor, which preparedly had already united and strategized with the nine villages that made up the Ekweteghete, being the general name of the nine villages that were subjected to the unrewarded compulsory labour.

It was in celebration of this victory which Ukpor recorded in the War of Agbaja that the then king (Eze Obiukwu) decided to kill a cow for the people and call for merriment; and other villages which shared in the victory 'hit their chests' and determined that they would also bring their own cows, all of which were then sampled and hauled round the village square, with a view to knowing which village came with the biggest cow. These cows were thereafter killed and used for merriment which was then named 'Asara', coming from the Igbo word '-' which implies merriment.

Climate 
In Ukpor, the wet season is warm, oppressive, and overcast and the dry season is hot, muggy, and partly cloudy. Over the course of the year, the temperature typically varies from 67 °F to 88 °F and is rarely below 59 °F or above 91 °F.

Impact of flooding 

The community has spent all it has and made desperate efforts to tackle the devastating gully erosion that is currently tearing away the entire community to no avail.

Notable people
Mbazulike Amaechi (1929 – 2022)  - Writer, Politician and Educationist, 2nd Senate President of Nigeria (16, 1960 to January 15, 1966) and Acting President of Nigeria (1965–1966), former Minister of Aviation, in the First Republic of Nigeria.
Obiageli Ezekwesili - Nigeria's highly influential personality and former Minister of Education/former Minister of Solid Minerals.
Chief Gabriel Akachukwu Okeke (1929-1991) - Among the all-time most influential leaders of the union. Fondly called Gab Okeke by his contemporaries, he was Secretary-General of the union for 26 years from 1961 to 1987.

References

External links
Article on Wikimapia

Populated places in Anambra State
Climate change
Natural disasters
Effects of climate change
Climate change and the environment
Climate change and society